Nyron Wau (born 24 November 1982) is a Dutch Antillean former professional footballer. He had experience playing both professional football in the Eredivisie and amateur football in many lower leagues.

Career
Wau played for PSV Eindhoven against PAOK in UEFA Cup 2001-02, being brought on in the last minute. However, he never made a league appearance for the Dutch giants.

Wau signed a three-year contract Helmond Sport during the summer of 2004, though the contract was ended early as he chose to join RBC Roosendaal on a two-year deal the following summer.

External links

1982 births
Dutch footballers
Dutch people of Curaçao descent
Living people
Dutch Antillean footballers
Eredivisie players
Eerste Divisie players
PSV Eindhoven players
MVV Maastricht players
Helmond Sport players
RBC Roosendaal players
FC Den Bosch players
AGOVV Apeldoorn players
Association football wingers
People from Geldrop
Curaçao footballers
Nea Salamis Famagusta FC players
FC DAC 1904 Dunajská Streda players
Dayton Dutch Lions players
Slovak Super Liga players
Dutch expatriate footballers
Dutch Antillean expatriate footballers
Expatriate footballers in Cyprus
Expatriate footballers in Slovakia
Expatriate soccer players in the United States
Dutch expatriate sportspeople in Cyprus
Dutch expatriate sportspeople in Slovakia
Dutch expatriate sportspeople in the United States
Footballers from North Brabant